is an underground interchange metro station located in Kita-ku, Nagoya, Aichi Prefecture, Japan, operated by the Transportation Bureau City of Nagoya.

Lines

Layout
The Meijō Line portion of the station has two underground side platforms and the Kamiiida Line portion of the station has one underground island platform underneath that of the Meijō Line.

Platforms

Station history
Heian-dōri Station was opened on December 20, 1971 as a station on the Meijō Line. The Kamiida Line connected to the station on March 27, 2003.

Passenger statistics
In fiscal 2018, the station was used by an average of 6,340 passengers daily.

Surrounding area
Meihoku Elementary School
Wakaba Junior High School

See also
Official home page

References

External links
 

Railway stations in Japan opened in 1967
Railway stations in Nagoya
Stations of Nagoya Municipal Subway